Vellavoor  is a village in Kottayam district in the state of Kerala, India.

Demographics
 India census, Vellavoor had a population of 17030 with 8336 males and 8694 females.

References

Villages in Kottayam district